Colin Dibley (born 19 September 1944) is a former tennis player from Australia.

Dibley once held the title for the fastest serve in the world at 148 m.p.h. During his professional career, he also won four singles and seventeen doubles titles. The right-hander reached his career-high singles ranking of world No. 26 in June 1973. After retiring in 1981, he took up real estate, still keeping himself in the game through coaching others.

Known for his enormous serve, Dibley has been noted as having one of the most "live arms" of his generation by ESPN commentator Pam Shriver.

Career finals

Singles 7 (4 titles, 3 runner-ups)

Doubles 32 (17 titles, 15 runner-ups)

External links
 
 
 
 nj.com article

1944 births
Living people
Australian male tennis players
Tennis players from Sydney
20th-century Australian people
21st-century Australian people